Kim Soo-myun (born 4 November 1986, Pohang) is a South Korean gymnast. Kim was part of the South Korean team that won the bronze medal in the team event at the 2006 Asian Games, as well as the South Korean 2007 World Championships team and 2008 and 2012 Olympic teams. His best event is floor exercise.

Education
 Korea National Sport University

References

External links
 

Living people
1986 births
South Korean male artistic gymnasts
Olympic gymnasts of South Korea
Gymnasts at the 2008 Summer Olympics
Gymnasts at the 2012 Summer Olympics
Asian Games medalists in gymnastics
Gymnasts at the 2006 Asian Games
Gymnasts at the 2010 Asian Games
Korea National Sport University alumni
People from Pohang
Asian Games gold medalists for South Korea
Asian Games bronze medalists for South Korea
Medalists at the 2006 Asian Games
Medalists at the 2010 Asian Games
Universiade medalists in gymnastics
Universiade gold medalists for South Korea
Universiade bronze medalists for South Korea
Sportspeople from North Gyeongsang Province
21st-century South Korean people